Shawo may refer to the following locations in China:

Town
 Shawo, Xin County (沙窝镇), in Xin County, Xinyang, Henan

Townships
 Shawo Township, Hebei (砂窝乡), in Fuping County
 Shawo Township, Henan (沙沃乡), in Qi County, Kaifeng
 Shawo Township, Hubei (沙窝乡), in Echeng District, Ezhou, Hubei
 Shawo Township, Shandong (沙窝乡), in Dongming County

Villages
 Shawo, a village in Shawo Township, Echeng District, Ezhou, Hubei

Therpa Shawo : Tibetan nationality

Township name disambiguation pages